"Pseudomonas tomato" is a Gram-negative plant pathogenic bacterium that infects a variety of plants. It was once considered a pathovar of Pseudomonas syringae, but following DNA-relatedness studies, it was recognized as a separate species and several other former P. syringae pathovars were incorporated into it. Since no official name has yet been given, it is referred to by the epithet  'Pseudomonas tomato' .

Pathovars 
 "Pseudomonas tomato" pv. antirrhini attacks snapdragons (Antirrhinum majus).
 "Pseudomonas tomato" pv. apii attacks celery (Apium graveolens).
 "Pseudomonas tomato" pv. berberidis attacks Berberis species.
 "Pseudomonas tomato" pv. delphinii attacks Delphinium species.
 "Pseudomonas tomato" pv. lachrymans attacks cucumbers (Cucumis sativus).
 "Pseudomonas tomato" pv. maculicola attacks members of Brassica and Raphanus.
 "Pseudomonas tomato" pv. morsprunorum attacks plums (Prunus domestica).
 "Pseudomonas tomato" pv. passiflorae attacks passion fruit (Passiflora edulis).
 "Pseudomonas tomato" pv. persicae attacks the plum relative Prunus persica.
 "Pseudomonas tomato" pv. philadelphi attacks the sweet mock-orange (Philadelphus coronarius).
 "Pseudomonas tomato" pv. primulae attacks Primula species.
 "Pseudomonas tomato" pv. ribicola attacks the golden currant Ribes aureum.
 "Pseudomonas tomato" pv. tomato attacks the tomato (Lycopersicon esculentum) causing it to fruit less.
 "Pseudomonas tomato" pv. viburni attacks Viburnum species.

See also 
 Plant pathology

References 

Pseudomonadales
Bacterial plant pathogens and diseases
Ornamental plant pathogens and diseases
Vegetable diseases
Root vegetable diseases
Small fruit diseases
Stone fruit tree diseases
Tomato diseases
Undescribed species